The Al-Abbas Shrine is the mausoleum of Abbas ibn Ali and a mosque, located near the Imam Husayn Mosque in Karbala, Iraq. Abbas was son of Ali ibn Abi Talib and the half-brother of Imam Hasan and Imam Husayn. He was Husayn's flag-bearer in the Battle of Karbala and chief of his caravans. The shrine is revered by the Shia Muslims who visit it every year, especially in the month of Muharram. 

Environmental effects over the years have caused the Euphrates river to change course. Nearly 1,400 years after the Battle of Karbala, the river flows across the grave of Abbas and encircles it. It is said that the Euphrates has come to ‘Abbās now.

In recent years the shrine has undergone a series of enhancements and additions, such as the re-gilding of the dome, and more recently covering the former courtyard with a roof to accommodate pilgrims better. Each year the shrine is visited by millions of pilgrims coming from all over the world.

History and design

Emperors and kings of various dynasties have offered valuable gifts and gems to the shrine of Al-Abbas ibn Ali. In 1622 Abbas Shah Safavi ordered the decoration of the grave's dome. He built a window around the grave and organized the precinct.

The majority of the modern design was done by Persian and Central Asian architects. The central teardrop shaped dome is an ornately decorated structure, with an internal and external dome. The internal dome visible from the inside is ornately decorate with fine mirror work. Two tall minarets stand on the domes sides, they were gilded in gold in the renovation works of 2007. The tomb is covered with pure gold and surrounded by a trellis of silver, along with Iranian carpets rolled out on the floors.

Renovation

Beginning in 2012, the Al Abbas mosque has undergone extensive renovations intended to improve the ability of the shrine to accommodate the millions of pilgrims who visit each year. The renovations include rebuilding the wall surrounding the shrine and turning it into a multi-story building housing museums, offices, and additional prayer halls. As well, the dome and minaret have been re-gilded, and the shrine's courtyard has been covered with a roof.

In 2014, construction began on a basement intended to further accommodate pilgrims. The basement is to be located under the perimeter of the main courtyard and involves systematically closing off parts of the courtyard and then excavating the current court yard. The project is also set to deal with foundational issues of the shrine and reinforce the structure whose foundation has water gaps in it; as part of the Euphrates runs around the grave of Abbas. Once this work is completed, pilgrims will have access for the first time ever to the sardab of Abbas and it will be the closest point to the actual grave. In March 2016 a new Zarih for the grave of Abbas was completed. It is the first Zarih to be fully built in Iraq by Iraqi hands, and was duly inaugurated on the 13th of Rajab the birth of Imam Ali, which coincides with April 21, 2016.

Timeline

See also

 Abbas ibn Ali
 Arba'een
 Holiest sites in Islam (Shia)
 List of the oldest mosques in the world
 Karbala International Airport

References

Shia mosques in Iraq
Shrines in Iraq
Mausoleums in Iraq
17th-century mosques
Buildings and structures in Karbala
Safavid architecture
Shia shrines